Paraná is a department of the province of Entre Ríos (Argentina).

References 

Departments of Entre Ríos Province